In 2017 in Burundi, 20% of girls are married off before age 18. 3% are married before they turn 15.

References 

Burundi
Childhood in Africa
Society of Burundi
Women's rights in Burundi
Social issues in Burundi
Violence against women in Burundi
Marriage in Africa